Green wrasse may refer to these fish:
 Labrus viridis —  widespread in eastern part of the northern Atlantic
 Choerodon schoenleinii — blackspot tuskfish, a wrasse found in coral reefs in the South China Sea and Southeast Asia including Australia
 Halichoeres solorensis
 Notolabrus inscriptus — widespread in Australia